Fuldner is a German language habitational surname. Notable people with the name include:
 Carlos Fuldner (1910–1992), Argentine born Nazi and businessman
 Virginia Ruth Fuldner (1947), American former competition swimmer

German-language surnames
German toponymic surnames